Natsue (written: , ,  in hiragana or  in katakana) is a feminine Japanese given name.  Notable people with the name include:

, Japanese athlete
, Japanese admiral
, Japanese cyclist
, Japanese handball player
, Japanese singer

Japanese feminine given names